This is a list of metro stations of Baku Metro in Baku, Azerbaijan. At present Baku Metro has 27 metro stations. The Red Line (Qırmızı xətt) has 13 metro stations, the Green Line (Yaşıl xətt) has 10 metro stations and the Purple Line (Bənövşəyi xətt) has 4 metro stations.

Stations

Under construction stations

There are 4 stations under construction.

Planned Stations

46 More stations are planned.

See also
List of metro systems

References

External links

 Baku Metro 
 Urbanrail – Baku Metro 

 
metro stations
Baku metro
Baku metro stations
Baku
Metro stations
Baku Metro stations